The 2001–02 Northern Football League season was the 104th in the history of Northern Football League, a football competition in England.

Division One

Division One featured 18 clubs which competed in the division last season, along with three new clubs, promoted from Division Two:
 Ashington
 Thornaby
 Washington Ikeda Hoover

League table

Division Two

Division Two featured 16 clubs which competed in the division last season, along with four new clubs.
 Clubs relegated from Division One:
 Crook Town
 Easington Colliery
 Hebburn Town
 Plus:
 Washington Nissan, joined from the Wearside Football League

League table

References

External links
 Northern Football League official site

Northern Football League seasons
2001–02 in English football leagues